Club Deportivo Purranque is a Chilean Football club, their home town is Purranque, Chile. They currently play in the fourth level of Chilean football, the Tercera División B.

The club were founded in on 2010 and participated for 1 year in Tercera División B.

Seasons played
1 season in Tercera División B

See also
Chilean football league system

External links
 Unofficial Website 

Purranque
Purranque
2010 establishments in Chile